Susan Elliott may refer to:
 Susan Elliott (academic), Australian academic specialising in medical education
 Susan J. Elliott (born 1956), American author, media commentator, and lawyer
 Susan M. Elliott, president and CEO of the National Committee on American Foreign Policy
 Susan Elliott (judge), Canadian judge